The Runaway Girl (German: Die Durchgängerin) is a 1928 German silent comedy film directed by Hanns Schwarz and starring Käthe von Nagy, Vivian Gibson and Jean Dax. The film's sets were designed by the art director Erich Zander.

Cast
 Käthe von Nagy as Ilsebill
 Vivian Gibson as Gina, ihre Mutter
 Jean Dax as Oberregierungsrat R. Thoms, ihr Vater
 Hans Brausewetter as Hans Brausewetter
 Mathias Wieman as Vladimir Pekoff, ein Komponist
 Karl Platen as Franz, Diener im Hause Thoms
 Adele Sandrock as Leokadia Spannagel, Direktorin des Mädchenpensionats

References

Bibliography
 Bock, Hans-Michael & Bergfelder, Tim. The Concise CineGraph. Encyclopedia of German Cinema. Berghahn Books, 2009.

External links

1928 films
Films of the Weimar Republic
Films directed by Hanns Schwarz
German silent feature films
German black-and-white films
1928 comedy films
German comedy films
1920s German films